Kerala Blasters Football Club Reserves and Academy, also known as Kerala Blasters B, are the reserve team and academy of the Kochi based Indian Super League club Kerala Blasters. The reserve team of the Blasters most recently competed in the Kerala Premier League, the top division of Kerala football and the RF Development League. The club's youth system consists of three teams, Under-18, Under-15 and Under-13 age groups that competes in their respective age divisions of the Ernakulam District Youth League. The youth teams of the Blasters has previously played in the Elite League, the top tier of the youth football system in India.

Reserves

History
On 20 February 2018, it was announced by the All India Football Federation, the organising body for Indian football, that the Kerala Blasters along with six other Indian Super League sides would field a reserve team in the I-League 2nd Division, India's then second division football league.

The first ever competitive match for the reserves was against Ozone FC on 16 March 2018 in which they suffered a defeat. But they managed to become the table toppers of Group B by winning seven games from ten matches. However, as per the rules, reserve teams of the clubs were not eligible for advancing into the final round. In the same year itself, the side also started to participate in the Kerala Premier League, which is the top division league for the clubs from Kerala. During their first season in KPL, they finished the group stage in third place, thus missing the play-offs.

In 2018-19 ,they finished in third place of the group. In KPL they became the semi-finalists during the  2018-19 season.

They won the 2019-2020 season of Kerala Premier League after defeating the reserve side of their rivals Gokulam Kerala FC in a penalty shootout. In the I-League 2nd Division, they finished the season in fifth place.

In January 2021, the club appointed T. G. Purushothaman as their new head coach, replacing Renjith TA and Shameel Chembakath.

In April 2022, they made their debut in the inaugural edition of the Reliance Foundation Development League (RFDL). Technical Advisor Tomasz Tchorz was appointed as the head coach while T.G Purushothaman became his assistant. The team won five out of the seven matches which included six clean sheets. With sixteen points in total, they finished second in the table behind Bengaluru FC reserves and qualified for the Next Gen Cup, which was held in the United Kingdom. In the Next Gen Cup's group B semi final, they lost 7–0 against Tottenham Hotspur F.C Academy. In the third-place play-off, they lost 1–4 to Crystal Palace F.C Academy.

In August 2022, with the first team preparing for the 2022–23 Indian Super League season, Kerala Blasters fielded their reserves for the 2022 Durand Cup. With two wins, a draw and two defeats, they qualified for the quarter-finals as the second team from Group D behind Odisha FC. In the quarter finals, they were defeated 3-0 by Mohammedan SC.

Reserves squad

Statistics and records

Season-by-season

Note: Reserve clubs are not promoted nor allowed to play in playoffs of I-League 2nd Division

Kit manufacturers and Shirt sponsors

Youth and academy
The Kerala Blasters youth system known as KBFC Young Blasters currently consists of 3 teams from 3 different age groups, the Under-18, Under-15 and Under-13. The U-18 team had previously participated in the Elite league, which is the top division of youth football in India Similarly, the U-15 team had played in the Hero Juniors League and the junior most team, the U-13 team, had played in the Hero Sub-Juniors League respectively. Players from the under-18 team are promoted into the reserve team based on their performance.

History

Inception and early years: 20152019 
In association with the Kerala Football Association, the Kerala Blasters announced the opening of 25 football schools throughout Kerala. In addition to the schools, the club announced that they would also hold weekend grassroots leagues for the children of under-10 to under-16 and the start of a residential academy in the future. The first Kerala Blasters Football School was inaugurated on 11 August 2015 at Dr. Ambedkar Stadium Kochi after 15 months which the club was founded. Later, three more schools were opened in Thiruvananthapuram, Kozhikode and Thrissur as a part of the club's new youth academy system. Former Irish International Terry Phelan was appointed as the head of the grassroots. In 2017, Thangboi Singto was appointed as the technical director of the youth. In the same year itself, their U-18 and U-15 teams began to participate in the Elite League and Juniors League respectively. The U-18 team became the runners up of the 2017–18 Youth League in their first ever appearance while the U-15 side managed to reach the play-offs. In 2018, the U-13 side started to participate in the Sub-Juniors League.

KB Young Blasters: 2019present 
In 2019, Kerala Blasters rejuvenated their youth system. They launched the KB Young Blasters and appointed Mario Marinică as the technical director of the youth. As a part of this, a residential academy was also launched for the first time in club's history. The Blasters also announced that they will launch India's first ever goalkeeping academy in Kochi headed by John Burridge. As a part of KB Young Blasters, the club also started the Young Ambassador Program in September 2020. It focus on the promising youngsters from the club's Young Blasters centers across Kerala to make them oriented, trained and equipped with adequate skill and technique, to be the face and voice of the club in the future.

On 16 October 2020, the Blasters announced a five-year partnership agreement with "Sporthood", which is a network of sports centres. The Young Blasters program is now termed as "Young Blasters – Sporthood Academy", that imparts a Kerala Blasters verified performance training curriculum to kids, reviewed and audited by the club's experts from time to time. On 16 January  2021, the club announced the association of "FC Imphal City", the first academy from Manipur to play in the Hero Indian Elite League with the Young Blasters – Sporthood Academy. This was the first time that the Blasters expanded their grassroot system outside of Kerala. In February 2021, the club's senior team assistant manager Tomasz Tchórz took over as the Technical advisor/director role at the Blasters.

On 5 July 2022, the club announced that their academy programme has crossed 3,000 admissions, which was the highest number of admissions ever achieved by a football academy in Kerala.

The sports Kerala-Kerala Blasters academy 
On 16 September 2021, Kerala Blasters launched the Sports Kerala-Kerala Blasters academy in association with the Government of Kerala. As part of a five-year deal, the Blasters is managing a residential football academy for the U-14, U-17 and U-20 categories for boys at the GV Raja Sports School, Thiruvananthapuram.

Youth squads

Kerala Blasters U-18  
Kerala Blasters Under-18 team also known as Kerala Blasters C currently participates in the Ernakulam District Youth League under-18 division. They had played the Elite League in the past. They are also the second reserve team of the club and is coached by T. G. Purushothaman, who is the assistant manager of the reserve team. The team's best performance came in 2018 as they finished finalists in the 2017–18 season of the elite league.

Current squad 

 
 

Elite Youth League U18 statistics of Kerala Blasters U18

Kerala Blasters U-15 
Kerala Blasters Under-15 side currently participates in the Ernakulam District Youth League. They had played the Hero Juniors League (Elite U15) and the Kerala U15 Academy League in the past. The team had a good run in the 2018–19 season of the Hero Juniors League as they made it to the semi-finals of the competition. The team is currently head coached by Noor, who also serves as the assistant manager of the under-18 team of the Blasters.

Current squad 

 

Hero Juniors League statistics of Kerala Blasters U15

Kerala Blasters U-13 
The Under-13 side of the Blasters currently plays in the Ernakulam District Youth League under-13 division. The team had played the Hero Sub-juniors League (Elite U13) in the past.

Current squad 

 
 

Hero Sub-Juniors League statistics of Kerala Blasters U13

Current technical staff 
As of 14 September 2022

Technical directors of youth

Honours

Reserves
Kerala Premier League
 Winners (1): 2019–20

Youth
 Elite League (Youth League U18)

  Runners-up (1): 2017–18

References

External links

 

Kerala Blasters FC Reserves and Academy
Football clubs in Kochi
Indian reserve football teams
Football academies in India
Association football clubs established in 2018
I-League 2nd Division clubs
2018 establishments in Kerala